Lodewijk "Lo" Jacobs (born 3 July 1951) is a Dutch sprint canoer who competed in the late 1970s. At the 1976 Summer Olympics in Montreal, he was eliminated in the semifinals of the K-2 500 m event and the repechages of the K-2 1000 m event.

References
Sports-reference.com profile

1951 births
Living people
Canoeists at the 1976 Summer Olympics
Dutch male canoeists
Olympic canoeists of the Netherlands
Sportspeople from Zaanstad
20th-century Dutch people
21st-century Dutch people